Välko Tuul (born Alfred-Oscar Tuul, 1894, Tallinn – 1918, Tallinn) was an Estonian painter.

Biography
Välko Tuul was born in the present-day capital of Estonia, Tallinn, and started studying art in his free time. In 1913 he joined the art school of Ants Laikmaa, encouraged by his friend Oskar Kallis. His works were exhibited for the first time in 1915. In 1917, he joined the artist's group Vikerla together with Oskar Kallis, Aleksander Mülber, Balder Tomasberg and Roman Haavamägi. He died of pneumonia in 1918, aged only 23.

Art
The paintings by Tuul are often characterised by an oneiric quality, underlined by his frequent use of blue shades. Stylistically, he can be counted among the Estonian Symbolists and several of his paintings are on themes from the Estonian national epic Kalevipoeg.

References

External links

1894 births
1918 deaths
20th-century Estonian painters
20th-century Estonian male artists
People from the Governorate of Estonia
Artists from Tallinn